Rhythm of Love is the fifth album by American R&B/soul singer Anita Baker, released in 1994. The album peaked at #3 on the U.S. Billboard 200 and #1 on the Billboard Top R&B/Hip Hop chart and was certified double platinum, giving Baker her fourth platinum selling album.

This is the first album since 1983's The Songstress by Baker not to be produced by longtime collaborator Michael J. Powell, who had agreed to split the arrangement after the release of Baker's 1990 album, Compositions. The album's first single, "Body and Soul", gave Baker her first top 40 hit since 1989. "You Belong to Me" is a cover of the Carly Simon classic, not to be confused with the song of the same title that Baker recorded for her 1988 album Giving You the Best That I Got.

Baker also received a Grammy Award in 1995 for Best Female R&B Vocal Performance for "I Apologize". "Body and Soul" was nominated for 1995 Grammy Awards for Best Female R&B Vocal Performance and Best R&B Song, and Rhythm of Love was nominated for Best R&B Album.

Rhythm of Love is Baker's last album for Elektra Records. Because of dissatisfaction with the album's promotion, Baker filed a lawsuit against Elektra, requesting a transfer to another label within Warner Music Group. Finally she signed with Atlantic Records in September 1996.

Track listing
 "Rhythm of Love" (Anita Baker, Patrick Moten) - 5:50
 "The Look of Love" (Burt Bacharach, Hal David) - 4:47
 "Body and Soul" (Rick Nowels, Ellen Shipley) - 5:42
 "Baby" (Baker) - 4:25
 "I Apologize" (Baker, Barry J. Eastmond, Gordon Chambers) - 5:09
 "Plenty of Room" (Baker) - 4:57
 "It's Been You" (Sami McKinney, Michael O'Hara, Mary Unobsky) - 4:59
 "You Belong to Me" (Carly Simon, Michael McDonald) - 4:41
 "Wrong Man" (Baker) - 5:51
 "Only for a While" (Dawn Thomas) - 5:16
 "Sometimes I Wonder Why" (Mike Reid, Mack David) - 4:37
 "My Funny Valentine" (Richard Rodgers, Lorenz Hart) - 5:06

Personnel 
 Anita Baker – lead vocals, backing vocals (1, 3, 4, 6-10), acoustic piano intro (1), synth percussion (1), arrangements (1-4, 6, 7, 9, 11), vocal arrangements (2, 5, 12), BGV arrangements (8)
 Michael Bradford – acoustic piano intro (1), synthesizer programming (1)
 Barry J. Eastmond – acoustic piano (1, 3, 4, 5, 7), Rhodes (1, 3), synth bass (1), strings (1, 3), string arrangements (3), keyboards (5, 6), drum programming (5), arrangements (5, 7), synthesizers (7), synth solo (9), string pads (9)
 George Duke – additional percussion (1), percussion (3, 4, 6, 12), synth strings (6), electronic drums (6), Synclavier programming (woodwinds, bass, drums) (12), acoustic piano (12), Yamaha TX816 Rhodes (12), synth solo (12), arrangements (12)
 Joe Mardin – keyboards (2, 10), programming (2, 10), arrangements (2, 10, 11), cymbals (8), hi-hats (8), drums (11), strings and woodwinds (11)
 Joe Sample – acoustic piano (2, 11)
 Eddie Howard – acoustic piano solo (3)
 Luis Resto – Rhodes (4), vamp piano (4), synth pads (4), synth bass (4), acoustic piano (9), Ensoniq synthesizers (9), bass (9), drum and percussion programming (9), arrangements (9)
 Sammy Merendino – synthesizers (7), programming (7)
 Robbie Kondor – keyboards (8), programming (8)
 Greg Phillinganes – acoustic piano (10)
 Michael Thompson – rhythm guitar (1)
 Dean Parks – guitar (2, 3, 10)
 Paul Peterson – guitar (2), rhythm guitar (10)
 Steve Bargonetti – guitar (6)
 Ira Siegel – guitar (6, 7), guitar solo (7)
 Georg Wadenius – guitar (7)
 John McCurry – guitar (8)
 Bucky Pizzarelli – guitar (11)
 Paul Jackson Jr. – guitar (12)
 Nathan East – bass (3, 4)
 James Genus – bass (6)
 Anthony Jackson – bass (7, 8)
 Charnett Moffett – bass (11)
 Steve Ferrone – drums (1, 3, 4)
 Bernard Davis – drums (6)
 Bashiri Johnson – percussion (1)
 Steve Thornton – percussion (7)
 Andy Snitzer – saxophone (8)
 Everette Harp – alto saxophone (12)
 Dan Higgins – baritone saxophone (12), tenor saxophone (12)
 Reggie Young – trombone (12)
 Jerry Hey – trumpet (12)
 Patrick Moten – arrangements (1)
 Gordon Chambers – backing vocals (5), BGV arrangements (5)

Production 
 Anita Baker – executive producer, producer (1, 3, 6, 9)
 Tommy LiPuma – producer (2, 10, 11)
 Gerard Smerek – producer (4)
 Barry J. Eastmond – producer (5, 7)
 Arif Mardin – producer (8)
 George Duke – producer (12)
 Deborah Silverman-Kerr – project coordinator 
 Charilyn Suriano – project coordinator 
 Robin Smyth – art direction, design 
 Kip Lott – cover and booklet photography 
 Harry Langdon – additional pages booklet photography 
 Frank Ockenfels – additional booklet photography
 BNB Associates, Ltd. – management

Technical
 Chris Albert – assistant engineer
 Earl Cohen – assistant engineer, additional engineer (3, 6), engineer (5, 7)
 Ian Craigie – assistant engineer 
 John Mabilia-assistant engineer
 Carl Robinson-engineer
 George Duke – mixing (1, 3-6, 11, 12)
 Carl Glanville – assistant engineer
 Andy Grassi – assistant engineer 
 John Hendrickson – assistant engineer 
 David Kutch – assistant engineer 
 Michael O'Reilly – additional engineer (3, 10), engineer (8, 11), mixing (8)
 Randy Poole – engineer (2, 10)
 Doug Sax – mastering 
 Al Schmitt – engineer (1, 3), mixing (2, 10)
 Gerard Smerek – engineer (1-4, 6, 7, 9, 10), mixing (1, 3-7, 11), lead vocal recording (1-12), lead vocal and piano recording (2, 11)
 Erik Zobler – mixing (1, 3-6, 11, 12), engineer (12)
Studios
 Recorded at The Hit Factory, Electric Lady Studios, The Power Station, Unique Recording Studios, Skyline Studios, Clinton Recording Studios, Soundtrack Studios and Greene Street Studios (New York, NY); East Bay Studios (Tarrytown, NY); Pearl Sound Studios and Studio A (Detroit, MI); Ambiance Recorders (Farmington Hills, MI).
 Mixed at The Hit Factory and Unique Recording Studios (New York, NY); Bill Schnee Studios and Conway Studios (Hollywood, CA).
 Mastered at The Mastering Lab (Hollywood, CA).

Charts

Weekly charts

Year-end charts

Certifications

References

See also
List of number-one R&B albums of 1994 (U.S.)

1994 albums
Anita Baker albums
Albums produced by Arif Mardin
Albums produced by Tommy LiPuma
Elektra Records albums